Erton Fejzullahu (born 9 April 1988) is a professional former footballer who played as a striker. He previously represented Sweden at youth and full international level before making his debut for the Kosovo national team in 2016.

Early life
Fejzullahu was born in Mitrovica, SFR Yugoslavia. He came to Sweden as a three-year-old and grew up in the town of Karlshamn. He holds Kosovan, Albanian and Swedish passports.

Club career

Youth career
Fejzullahu began his career with fifth-tier team Högadals IS, before moving to Danish side FC Copenhagen in 2005.

Mjällby AIF
In January 2007 Fejzullahu returned to Sweden to sign with Mjällby AIF, who played in the second tier Superettan at that time and therefore was the highest level club near his hometown. There Fejzullahu adjusted to first team football and eventually had a big breakthrough in the 2009 Superettan, where he scored 13 goals in 14 games during the first half of the season and played a key role in eliminating two Allsvenskan teams in the Svenska Cupen.

NEC Nijmegen
On 17 July 2009, Eredivisie club NEC Nijmegen signed Fejzullahu on a four-year contract. He started well and was a regular starter during his first year with the Dutch club. In his second year he found playing time harder to come by and was loaned out for a short period to Danish club Randers FC. He then went on a second loan back home to Mjällby for the second half of the 2011 Allsvenskan season. At first he struggled while playing for his old club. Fejzullahu later stated that this was caused by bad form and him lacking both mentally and physically at the time. He stayed with Mjällby for the first half of the following season too and there he finally started showing improved form, scoring six goals in 15 games. As the loan ended in summer 2012 Mjällby wanted to sign him permanently but could not afford it.

Djurgårdens IF
Djurgårdens IF instead bought him from the Dutch club for a reported sum of ten million SEK. On 31 July 2012, Fejzullahu signed a contract which made him a Djurgårdens IF player until summer 2016.

Beijing Guoan 
On 30 July 2014, Fejzullahu made his debut for Beijing Guoan, as a loan player with a performance of two goals and an assist. On 1 January 2015, he signed a contract with Beijing Guoan after the expiry of the contract as loan player from Djurgårdens IF.

Dalian Transcendence
On 25 January 2016, Fejzullahu moved to China League One side Dalian Transcendence.

Sarpsborg 08
On 28 March 2017, Fejzullahu signed to Eliteserien side Sarpsborg 08 and he signed a contract to end of 2017 Eliteserien. On 2 April 2017, he made his debut in a 3–1 home win against Sogndal after coming on as a substitute at 78th minute in place of Jonas Lindberg.

Kalmar
On 21 July 2017, Fejzullahu signed for Allsvenskan side Kalmar. On 23 July 2017, he made his debut in a 2–0 home win against AFC Eskilstuna after being named in the starting line-up.

International career
In December 2012 Fejzullahu was selected for the first time ever to join the Sweden, on a three-game tour in January 2013. On 23 January 2013. Fejzullahu made his debut for the senior team and scoring the equalizing goal in a 1–1 draw against North Korea in the King's Cup. After full-time was played, the standing was 1–1, and Sweden won on penalty-shootout. Through this victory Sweden also became unofficial world champions.

In December 2014 Fejzullahu expressed to the media that he expected to be part of the Albania, since he was an ethnic Albanian and Sweden had ignored him. He was in contact with the Albanian Football Association and was expected to be called up by Albania's coach, Gianni de Biasi.

On 7 October 2015, Fejzullahu received a call-up from Kosovo for the friendly match against Equatorial Guinea and made his debut after being named in the starting line-up.

Career statistics

Club

International

Scores and results list the Fejzullahu's national team's goal tally first, score column indicates score after each Fejzullahu goal.

Honours
Sweden
 King's Cup: 2013

Notes and references

Notes

References

External links

 
 

1988 births
Living people
Sportspeople from Mitrovica, Kosovo
Kosovan emigrants to Sweden
Association football forwards
Kosovan men's footballers
Kosovo international footballers
Swedish men's footballers
Sweden youth international footballers
Sweden under-21 international footballers
Sweden international footballers
Dual internationalists (football)
F.C. Copenhagen players
Mjällby AIF players
NEC Nijmegen players
Randers FC players
Djurgårdens IF Fotboll players
Beijing Guoan F.C. players
Dalian Transcendence F.C. players
Sarpsborg 08 FF players
Kalmar FF players
FK Žalgiris players
Allsvenskan players
Superettan players
Eredivisie players
Chinese Super League players
China League One players
Eliteserien players
A Lyga players
Kosovan expatriate footballers
Swedish expatriate footballers
Expatriate men's footballers in Denmark
Kosovan expatriate sportspeople in Denmark
Swedish expatriate sportspeople in Denmark
Expatriate footballers in the Netherlands
Kosovan expatriate sportspeople in the Netherlands
Swedish expatriate sportspeople in the Netherlands
Expatriate footballers in China
Kosovan expatriate sportspeople in China
Swedish expatriate sportspeople in China
Expatriate footballers in Norway
Kosovan expatriate sportspeople in Norway
Swedish expatriate sportspeople in Norway
Expatriate footballers in Lithuania
Kosovan expatriate sportspeople in Lithuania
Swedish expatriate sportspeople in Lithuania